William Justin Fisk (June 25, 1833March 1, 1909) was an American banker and Republican politician. He served three years in the Wisconsin State Assembly (1875–1878), representing Brown County.

Biography
Fisk was born on June 25, 1833, in Brunswick, Ohio. Sources have differed on his residential history, but he apparently settled in Fort Howard, Wisconsin, in 1853. There, his father, Joel S. Fisk, became Postmaster. Fisk operated a shingle mill before becoming a lumberman and bank president and director.

On January 8, 1855, Fisk married Mary J. Driggs. They had four sons, including Wilbur D. Fisk, who became treasurer of Fort Howard. Mary's sister, Martha, married Samuel Ryan, Jr. After Mary's death in April 1903, Fisk married Hattie Trowel on November 21, 1904. He died at his home in Green Bay on March 1, 1909.

Political career
Fisk was a member of the Assembly from 1875 through 1877. Previously, he had been Postmaster of Fort Howard from 1862 to 1865. He was a Republican.

References

People from Brunswick, Ohio
Republican Party members of the Wisconsin State Assembly
Wisconsin postmasters
American bank presidents
Millers
1833 births
1909 deaths
19th-century American politicians
19th-century American businesspeople